Zeleia was a town of the ancient Troad, at the foot of Mount Ida and on the banks of the river Aesepus (both located in Turkey), at a distance of 80 stadia from its mouth. It is mentioned by Homer in the Trojan Battle Order in the Iliad, and later when Homer calls it a holy town. Zeleia led a force of warriors to aid Troy during the Trojan War, led by Pandarus, son of Lycaon (the latter Lycaon not to be confused with Lycaon, son of Priam. It is later related that the people of Zeleia are "Lycians", though the Zeleians are distinct from the Lycians who come from Lycia in southwestern Asia Minor, led by Sarpedon and Glaucus. 

Arrian mentions it as the headquarters of the Persian army before the Battle of the Granicus, in May 334 BCE, where the Persian satraps held a council at Zeleia where they discussed how best to confront Alexander the Great. It existed in the time of Strabo; but afterwards it disappears. 

Arthmios (Aryan-Luvian meaning truly mine or my perfect one) of Zeleia together with his family, was declared an outlaw in the territory of Athens and her allies, because he had brought the gold from Persian Empire into Peloponnese. 
Nicagoras of Zeleia, was a tyrant of Zeleia.

The site of ancient Zeleia is located near Sarıköy, Balıkesir, Turkey.

See also 
 Ancient sites of Balıkesir

References

Populated places in ancient Troad
Cities in ancient Troad
Locations in the Iliad
Former populated places in Turkey
Members of the Delian League
Holy cities
History of Balıkesir Province